The Dick Knost Show is a 2013 Canadian comedy film written and directed by Bruce Sweeney. The film stars Tom Scholte as Dick Knost, an opinionated loudmouth sports broadcaster who undergoes a personal transformation after suffering a concussion.

It premiered in the Contemporary World Cinema section at the 2013 Toronto International Film Festival. It also won Best BC Film at the Vancouver International Film Festival.

Cast
 Tom Butler
 John Cassini as David
 Jillian Fargey
 David Lovgren
 Gabrielle Rose as Kelly
 Laara Sadiq
 Zak Santiago
 Tom Scholte
 Paul Skrudland
 Alexandra Staseson
 Qelsey Zeeper

References

External links
 

2013 films
2010s sports comedy films
Canadian sports comedy films
English-language Canadian films
Films directed by Bruce Sweeney
2013 comedy films
2010s English-language films
2010s Canadian films